The Dongjin Bridge or Jianchunmen Pontoon Bridge in Ganzhou, Jiangxi province, China is a pontoon bridge constructed over the Gong River in the Chinese Song Dynasty (960-1279). Situated outside the Jianchunmen gate of the Ganzhou city wall, it is the survivor of several pontoon bridges found in China.

Its length is a total of roughly 400 metres long, made up of wooden planks placed on around 100 wooden boats linked together with iron chains.

See also
Architecture of the Song Dynasty

Pontoon bridges
Bridges in Jiangxi
Chinese architectural history
Ganzhou
Transport in Jiangxi
Song dynasty architecture